Jackie Paisley was a professional female bodybuilder from Scottsdale, Arizona in the United States.

Legacy

As a college student who attended both Carnegie Mellon University and Arizona State University on a music scholarship, Paisley was drawn into the world of bodybuilding after she achieved a reputation as one of Arizona's top aerobics instructors. She attended her first state-wide bodybuilding show in 1982 and began to compete immediately after that. In 1989, she was challenging Cory Everson for the world championship on the Olympia stage.

After winning almost every bodybuilding show she ever entered, Paisley was known for always being extraordinarily lean, beautifully musclebound and in peak condition for every show.  Her background in ballet and her dynamic presence on stage propelled her to the elite level of the bodybuilding world for nearly a decade. After receiving her master's degree in Nutrition, she spent many years after retirement from competition as a professional nutritionist at the Beauvais Fitness Centers and other various gyms in the Phoenix metropolitan area.

Paisley had a son, born in 2005.  After the birth, she became a Christian and an avid Bible scholar, attending Scottsdale Bible Church and composing books about health, fitness, medicine and her newfound relationship with God.  She began to have health problems in 2015 and these became a serious illness in 2016.  On March 17, 2017, Paisley died. She was survived by her 12-year-old son and her brother.

Bodybuilding career

Amateur
Paisley won every state and local bodybuilding show in Arizona before proceeding to the professional ranks.

Professional
After IFBB officials presented strong evidence against Tonya Knight that she got someone other than herself her to supply test-passing urine, she admitted that she sent a surrogate to take a mandatory drug test administered before the 1988 Ms. Olympia, where she finished fourth. In a ruling handed down in November 1989, Knight was suspended and stripped of her 1989 Ms. International title and prize money. Paisley, who had been the runner-up, was thus awarded the title.

Titles
Paisley was awarded the titles of 1983 Miss Phoenix Bodybuilding Champion, 1984 Miss Arizona Bodybuilding Champion, 1986 NPC National Champion (Heavyweight Division), 1987 Miss USA Bodybuilding Champion (Heavyweight and Overall), 1989 Miss International Bodybuilding Champion (Heavyweight Division), and 4th place in the 1989 Miss Olympia Bodybuilding World Championships, 6th place in the 1990 Miss Olympia Bodybuilding World Championships, and 11th place in the 1991 Miss Olympia Bodybuilding World Championship.

Contest history
1985 NPC Nationals - 10th (LHW)
1986 NPC Nationals - 6th (HW)
1987 NPC USA Championship - 1st (HW & Overall)
1988 Ms. International - 3rd
1988 Pro World Championship - 8th
1989 Ms. International - 1st
1989 Pro World Championship - 2nd
1989 IFBB Ms. Olympia - 4th
1990 Ms. International - 2nd
1990 IFBB Ms. Olympia - 5th
1991 IFBB Ms. Olympia - 11th

References

| colspan = 3 align = center | Ms. International
|-
| width = 30% align = center | Preceded by:Cathey Palyo
| width = 40% align = center | First (1989)
| width = 30% align = center | Succeeded by:Laura Creavalle

American female bodybuilders
Sportspeople from Altoona, Pennsylvania
People from Blair County, Pennsylvania
Professional bodybuilders
1963 births
2017 deaths
21st-century American women